The FIFA Women's World Cup is considered the most prestigious association football tournament in the world. The 8 World Cup tournaments have been won by four national teams. United States have won three times, followed by Germany with two titles each; and Norway and Japan, with one title each.

Anson Dorrance led the United States national team to victory in the inaugural tournament in 1991. Jill Ellis is the only person who has won the World Cup twice as a manager, in 2015 and 2019 with United States. Seven different managers have won the World Cup and all winning managers led their own country's national team. Two other managers finished as winners once and runners-up once; Even Pellerud (winner in 1995, runners-up in 1991) for Norway, and Norio Sasaki (winner in 2011, runner-up in 2015) for Japan.

Even Pellerud holds the records for both most matches managed (25) and most matches won (16). Anson Dorrance is the youngest manager to win the World Cup, being 40 in 1991. Norio Sasaki is the oldest coach to win the World Cup, being aged 53 in 2011.

Winning managers

By nationality

See also
 List of FIFA Women's World Cup winning players

References

FIFA Women's World Cup-related lists
Lists of association football managers